Muston Meadows is an  biological Site of Special Scientific Interest south of Muston in Leicestershire. It is also a National Nature Reserve  and a Nature Conservation Review site.

These ridge and furrow meadows are on soils derived from clay. Herbs include green-winged orchid, lady's bedstraw, yellow rattle, pepper saxifrage and cowslip.

The site is in two different areas, both of which are open to the public.

At Muston Meadows, hay is cut in late summer and over winter the meadow is grazed by cattle. This prevents the meadow habitat from transitioning to forest through ecological succession. Some of the plants in the nature reserve only grow in meadows and this kind of habitat is very threatened in the UK; 97% of Britain's wildflower meadows have been destroyed since the 1930s.

References

Sites of Special Scientific Interest in Leicestershire
National nature reserves in England
Nature Conservation Review sites